Ashan Bayyan Sellasse Holgate (born 9 November 1986) is a footballer who plays as a striker or midfielder.

Holgate rejoined Newport County on a permanent contract on 13 October 2009. However, his contract at Newport was terminated by mutual consent on 22 January 2010. He then joined Maidenhead United, where he scored 11 goals. Holgate signed for Southern League Premier Division club Swindon Supermarine on 27 February 2010.

On 23 November 2012, Holgate joined Oxford City.

In December 2014, Holgate signed for Chippenham Town.

In January 2016, Holgate signed for Slough Town, scoring on his debut against Leamington.

References

External links 
 
 Swindon-Town-FC.co.uk – Ashan HOLGATE – Player Profile
 Ashan Holgate – Swindon Supermarine FC

1986 births
Living people
Sportspeople from Swindon
English footballers
Association football forwards
Association football midfielders
Swindon Town F.C. players
Basingstoke Town F.C. players
Salisbury City F.C. players
Newport County A.F.C. players
Macclesfield Town F.C. players
Weston-super-Mare A.F.C. players
Eastleigh F.C. players
Cirencester Town F.C. players
Swindon Supermarine F.C. players
Maidenhead United F.C. players
Oxford City F.C. players
Chippenham Town F.C. players
English Football League players
National League (English football) players
Southern Football League players